Vile may refer to:

Characters
 Vile (Mega Man X), a character from the Mega Man X game series
 Doctor Vile (Dr. Weil), a character from the Mega Man Zero game series
 V.I.L.E., a fictional villain group in the Carmen Sandiego franchise

Mythology 
 An alternate spelling of Vili, the brother of Oden in Norse mythology
 Vile, the plural of Vila (fairy) in south Slavic mythology

Music 
 Vile (album), a 1996 album by the death metal band Cannibal Corpse
 Vile (band), an American death metal band
 "Vile", a song by Dave Grohl

Places 
 Vile, Raigad, Raigad district, Maharashtra, India; on the Pune–Kolad road
 Vile Parle, a suburb of Mumbai in India

Other 
 Vile (film), a 2011 horror movie
 Vile (surname)
 Vile (text editor)

See also 
 Vial, a small container
 VIL (disambiguation)
 Vill, historical English administrative unit for small land holdings
 Viol, a musical instrument
 Weil (disambiguation), with a similar pronunciation